Journey to Arzrum is a 1936 Soviet drama film directed by Moisei Levin.

Plot 
The film is an adaptation of Alexander Pushkin's eponymous travel account of his journey to the Caucasus, Armenia, and Arzrum (modern Erzurum) in eastern Turkey during the Russo-Turkish War (1828–29).

Cast 
 Dmitry Zhuravlyov as Alexander Pushkin
 Serafim Azanchevsky as Ivan Paskevich
 Konstantin Khokhlov as Nurtsev
 Georgy Sochevko as Chernishev 
 Nikolay Ryzhov as Rayevsky
 Lev Kolesov as Buturlin
 Georgy Semyonov as Somichyov

References

External links 
 

1936 films
1930s Russian-language films
Soviet biographical drama films
1930s biographical drama films
Soviet black-and-white films
Films set in Armenia
1936 drama films
Films based on works by Aleksandr Pushkin
Cultural depictions of Alexander Pushkin
Lenfilm films
Biographical films about writers
Biographical films about poets